Joseph Stacy Murdock (June 26, 1822 – February 14, 1899) was an American colonizer, leader, and Latter-day Saint hymn writer. He wrote the words to "Come Listen to a Prophet's Voice."

Early years
Murdock was born in upstate New York in 1822. He married Eunice Sweet. He and his family were taught by a Latter Day Saint missionary and were baptized into the Church of Jesus Christ of Latter Day Saints. They had a desire to live with others of their faith and moved to Nauvoo, Illinois, in 1841.

Murdock and his wife migrated with the Mormon population to the Salt Lake Valley in Daniel Spencer's 1847 Mormon pioneer company.

Murdock was asked by Brigham Young to enter the practice of plural marriage and was sent to jail for doing so in 1889. Murdock was pardoned in 1894 by U.S. President Grover Cleveland. He had 32 children from six wives: Eunice Sweet, Eliza Clark, Adeline Warner, Jane Sharp, Elizabeth Hunter, and Pernetta.

Colonizer
After arriving in Utah, Brigham Young assigned Murdock the task of helping establish settlements in several areas of present-day Utah, Arizona, and Nevada. Murdock participated in the creation of American Fork, Utah; Heber City, Utah; Carson City, Nevada; and Muddy River (an abandoned settlement along the then southern Utah Territory and northern Arizona Territory, now in Nevada and called the Moapa Valley).

Poet
Murdock wrote the poem "Come Listen To A Prophet's Voice", which was put to music by Joseph J. Daynes. The hymn was based on Murdock's friendship with Joseph Smith, for whom he had acted as a bodyguard.

Heber City
In 1860, Murdock was set apart as a bishop by Brigham Young and sent to preside over the Latter-day Saints in Heber City, Utah, and vicinity. In this capacity he served as both the ecclesiastical and political leader for this new settlement.

On August 20, 1867, Murdock negotiated a peace treaty with Chief Tabby-To-Kwanah, the local Ute Indian chief, to end hostilities between the Ute Indians and the local settlers. This was one of the turning points which led to the end of the Utah Black Hawk War.

Murdock's home in Heber City is registered with the National Register of Historic Places

Later life
After working to establish cities throughout the west, Murdock settled in Heber City and worked as a farmer. He continued to serve in leadership positions in his church throughout his life. He died of pneumonia at the age of 76.

References

External links
 Joseph Stacy Murdock Family Organization

1822 births
1899 deaths
American people convicted of bigamy
American Latter Day Saint hymnwriters
American prisoners and detainees
Deaths from pneumonia in Utah
Mormon pioneers
People from Heber City, Utah
Writers from New York (state)
Prisoners and detainees of the United States federal government
19th-century American writers
American leaders of the Church of Jesus Christ of Latter-day Saints
Recipients of American presidential pardons